Campli is a town and comune in the province of Teramo, in the Abruzzo region of central Italy. It is located in the natural park known as the Gran Sasso e Monti della Laga National Park.

Geography
The towns of Bellante, Civitella del Tronto, Sant'Omero, Teramo, Torricella Sicura, Valle Castellana are nearby.

History 
During the 14th century, the composer Nicolaus Ricii de Nucella Campli was born presumably in or near the town.

The town was captured by the French under François de Guise in 1557 during his failed campaign against the Spanish in the Kingdom of Naples.

Festivals and events
Every year since 1964 in the month of August, there is a celebration that goes by the name of Sagra della porchetta italica (Feast of Italian Pork).  It is considered to be the first such event established in the Region of Abruzzo and one of the earliest organized in all of Italy.  One highlight of this festival is a pork sandwich cookoff.  The festival was founded by Fernando Aurini who was seeking to attract tourists and to disseminate information about the town which once made up a portion of the holdings of the powerful Farnese family.  In celebration of this event a practical tourist guide entitled "Campli" was published each year.  The Sagra della porchetta italica was an immediate success with crowds of up to 10,000 people attending in the mid 1960s.

Main sights
Museo Nazionale Archeologico (National Archeological Museum) - housed in the ancient 14th century Farnese palace
San Pietro (Church of Saint Peter): its walls contain Ancient Roman and High Medieval stone fragments
La Scala Santa (The Sacred Step), formed by  28 wooden steps which, if climbed on ones knees, bring absolution of sins by decree of Pope Clement IV- Located behind Palazzo Farnese, next to the fourteenth-century Church of San Paolo, the Sanctuary of the Holy Staircase attracts thousands of devotees every year. The Sanctuary houses a Holy Staircase which in 1772 Pope Clement XIV granted the same indulgences of the famous Holy Staircase of Rome. Pope John Paul II extended the benefits granted in the 18th century to all   Fridays of Lent.

From a beautiful sixteenth-century portal worked with diamond points and coming from the convent of Sant'Onofrio, you enter the interior, where a staircase of twenty-eight steps of polished wood and smooth begins the ascent of the penitent, religiously kneeling.

The staircase is completely surrounded by frescoes with motifs related to the Passion of Christ: while the ceiling is populated by images of angels carrying the symbols of the Passion, it is possible to admire on the right "Christ in the Garden of Olives", "The Flagellation" and "Christ Carrying the Cross" and on the left "The Capture", "Ecce homo", and the "Crucifixion".   Some of them and the whole decoration of the ceiling are attributed to the painter from Teramo Vincenzo Baldati (1759 - 1825).

References

External links

Official website
Secret World Travel Guides